The Black River is a tributary of the Duwamish River in King County in the U.S. state of Washington. It drained Lake Washington until 1916, when the opening of the Lake Washington Ship Canal lowered the lake, causing part of the Black River to dry up.

Before the 20th century, Lake Washington emptied from its south end into the Black River, which was joined by the Cedar River before meeting the White River (now the lower Green River; the White River has been diverted south). The confluence of the Black and White rivers created the Duwamish River, which emptied into Elliott Bay in Puget Sound. Thus, the water of rivers emptying into Lake Washington, such as the Sammamish River, once flowed through the Black and Duwamish rivers. Today, Lake Washington's water empties into Puget Sound via the Lake Washington Ship Canal.

In November 1911, the Cedar River flooded Renton. In 1912, the Cedar was diverted from the Black River into Lake Washington to avoid future floods. Its water still flowed through the Black after passing through Lake Washington. In 1916, with the opening of the Lake Washington Ship Canal in Seattle, the lake's level dropped nearly nine feet and the Black River dried up. Today, part of its bed forms the Black River Riparian Forest and Wetland.

The Duwamish people lived along the Black River for many centuries. Duwamish settlements remained along the river until it dried up in 1916. Several indigenous villages were located near the confluence of the Black and Duwamish rivers. The area was called "Inside Place" (Lushootseed: Dxwdəw, from which comes the word "Duwamish"), referring to its location inland from Puget Sound. Long used as a place of refuge, the area became home hundreds of natives displaced by the growing city of Seattle. The Black River was also a big fishery for the Duwamish people, until the river dried up.

See also
 Fort Dent
 List of rivers in Washington

References

External links

Rivers of Washington (state)
Rivers of King County, Washington
Former rivers